Dermody is a surname. Notable people with the surname include:

Clarke Dermody (born 1980), New Zealand rugby union footballer
Dorothy Dermody (1909–2012), Irish fencer
Elaine Dermody (born 1982), Irish camogie player
Frank Dermody (born 1951), American politician
Jack Dermody (1910–1990), Australian rules footballer
Jim Dermody (1898–1975), Irish hurler
Joe Dermody (born 1972), Irish hurler
Maeve Dermody (born 1985), Australian actress
Matt Dermody (born 1990), American baseball player
Thomas Dermody (1775–1802), Irish poet
Tom Dermody, American politician